Leila Borjali is an Iranian karateka. She won one of the bronze medals in the women's +68kg event at the 2021 Islamic Solidarity Games held in Konya, Turkey. She is also a two-time bronze medalist in this event at the Asian Karate Championships.

She won one of the bronze medals in her event at the 2021 Asian Karate Championships held in Almaty, Kazakhstan. She also won one of the bronze medals in her event at the 2022 Asian Karate Championships held in Tashkent, Uzbekistan.

Achievements

References

External links 
 

Living people
Year of birth missing (living people)
Place of birth missing (living people)
Iranian female karateka
Islamic Solidarity Games medalists in karate
Islamic Solidarity Games competitors for Iran
21st-century Iranian women